Oliveira de Frades is a municipality in the district Viseu in Portugal. The population in 2011 was 10,261, in an area of 145.35 km2.

The municipality was created in 1836 by splitting the former municipality Lafões into the current municipalities of Oliveira de Frades, Sao Pedro do Sul and Vouzela.

It is one of the few municipalities in Portugal without territorial continuity (the other being Montijo and Vila Real de Santo António): its territory comprehends two parts, with the town of Oliveira de Frades located in the bigger part, and Arca e Varzielas in the smaller part.

The present mayor is Paulo Ferreira, elected by the Nós, Cidadãos! party. The municipal holiday is October 7.

Parishes

Administratively, the municipality is divided into 8 civil parishes (freguesias):
 Arca e Varzielas 
 Arcozelo das Maias
 Destriz e Reigoso
 Oliveira de Frades, Souto de Lafões e Sejães
 Pinheiro
 Ribeiradio
 São João da Serra
 São Vicente de Lafões

Notable people 
 Vítor Vinha (born 1986) a former footballer with 185 club caps

References

External links
Municipality official website
Photos from Oliveira de Frades

 
Towns in Portugal
Populated places in Viseu District
Municipalities of Viseu District